Hymenobacter soli  is a Gram-negative, strictly aerobic, non-spore-forming and rod-shaped bacterium from the genus of Hymenobacter which has been isolated from grass soil in Korea.

References

External links
Type strain of Hymenobacter soli at BacDive -  the Bacterial Diversity Metadatabase

soli
Bacteria described in 2008